Leucanopsis lacteogrisea is a moth of the family Erebidae. It was described by Walter Rothschild in 1909. It is found in Venezuela.

References

lacteogrisea
Moths described in 1909